Atlantropa, also referred to as Panropa, was a gigantic engineering and colonisation idea that was devised by the German architect Herman Sörgel in the 1920s, and promoted by him until his death in 1952. The project was devised to contain several hydroelectric dams in key points of the Mediterranean Sea, such as the Strait of Gibraltar and the Bosporus, to cause a sea level drop and create new land to settle.

Design 

The project proposed four additional major dams as well: 
 Across the Dardanelles to hold back the Black Sea
 Between Sicily and Tunisia to provide a roadway and lower the inner Mediterranean further
 On the Congo River below its Kwah River tributary to refill the Mega-Chad basin around Lake Chad to provide fresh water to irrigate the Sahara and create a shipping lane to the interior of Africa
 Suez Canal extension and locks to maintain a Red Sea connection

Sörgel saw his scheme, which was projected to take over a century, as a peaceful Pan-European alternative to the  concepts, which later became one of the stated reasons for Nazi Germany's conquest of new territories. Atlantropa would provide land, food, employment, electric power, and, most of all, a new vision for Europe and neighbouring Africa.

The Atlantropa movement, throughout its several decades, was characterised by four constants:
Pacifism, in its promises of using technology peacefully
Pan-European sentiment, seeing the project as a way to unite a wartorn Europe
Eurocentric attitudes to Africa, which was to become united with Europe into "Atlantropa" or Eurafrica
Neocolonial geopolitics, which saw the world divided into three blocs: America, Asia and Atlantropa.

Active support was limited to architects and planners from Germany and a number of other primarily-Northern European countries. Critics derided it for various faults, ranging from lack of any co-operation of Mediterranean countries in the planning to the impacts that it would have had on the historic coastal communities that would be stranded inland when the sea receded. The project reached great popularity in the late 1920s to the early 1930s and again briefly in the late 1940s to the early 1950s, but it soon disappeared from general discourse after Sörgel's death.

History 

The plan was inspired by the then-new understanding of the Messinian salinity crisis, a pan-Mediterranean geological event that took place 5 to 6 million years ago. The contemporary geologists proposed that the large salt deposits surrounding the Mediterranean coast were the result of its partial isolation by a shrinking of the seaways connecting to the Atlantic. Today, most geoscientists believe that the Mediterranean underwent a significant drawdown during that period of at least a few hundred meters.

The utopian goal was to solve all the major problems of European civilisation by the creation of a new continent, "Atlantropa", consisting of Europe and Africa, to be inhabited by Europeans. Sörgel was convinced that to remain competitive with the Americas and an emerging Oriental "Pan-Asia", Europe needed to become self-sufficient, which meant possessing territories in all climate zones. Asia would forever remain a mystery to Europeans, and the British would not be able to maintain their global empire in the long run, and so a common European effort to colonise Africa was necessary.

The lowering of the Mediterranean would enable the production of immense amounts of electric power, guaranteeing the growth of industry. Unlike fossil fuels, the power source would not be subject to depletion. Vast tracts of land would be freed for agriculture, including the Sahara, which was to be irrigated with the help of three sea-sized manmade lakes in Africa. The massive public works, which were envisioned to go on for more than a century, would relieve unemployment, and the acquisition of new land would ease the pressure of overpopulation, which Sörgel thought were the fundamental causes of political unrest in Europe. He also believed the project's effect on the climate could be only beneficial, and that the climate could be changed for the better as far away as the British Isles, as a more effective Gulf Stream would create warmer winters. The Middle East, under the control of a consolidated Atlantropa, would be an additional energy source and a bulwark against the Yellow Peril.

The publicity material produced for Atlantropa by Sörgel and his supporters contain plans, maps and scale models of several dams and new ports on the Mediterranean, views of the Gibraltar dam crowned by a  tower designed by Peter Behrens, projections of the growth of agricultural production, sketches for a pan-Atlantropan power grid, and even provision for the protection of Venice as a cultural landmark. Concerns about climate change or earthquakes, when mentioned, were framed as positives rather than negatives. Sörgel's 1938 book  has a quote from Hitler on the flyleaf to demonstrate that the concept was consistent with Nazi ideology.

After World War II, interest was piqued again as the Western Allies sought to create closer bonds with their colonies in Africa in an attempt to combat growing Marxist influence in that region, but the invention of nuclear power, the cost of rebuilding and the end of colonialism left Atlantropa technologically unnecessary and politically unfeasible, although the Atlantropa Institute remained in existence until 1960.

Most proposals to dam the Strait of Gibraltar since that time have focused on the hydroelectric potential of such a project and do not envisage any substantial lowering of the Mediterranean sea level. A new idea, involving a tensioned fabric dam stretched between Europe and North Africa in the Gibraltar Strait, is envisioned to cope with any future global sea level rise outside the Mediterranean Sea Basin.

In popular culture
A version of the Atlantropa project was put forward by a character in Philip K. Dick's novel The Man in the High Castle and Amazon Studios series The Man in the High Castle, former  Martin Heusmann, who proposed to drain the entire Mediterranean with a dam across the Strait of Gibraltar.

See also

 Aral Sea
 Reber Plan
 Imperialism
 Megaproject
 Northern European Enclosure Dam
 Red Sea Dam
 Strait of Gibraltar crossing
 Three Gorges Dam
 Trans Global Highway

References

Further reading

External links
Pictures from 2006 the WDR/Phoenix television documentary
Reconstructions of parts of Atlantropa at the University of Technology in Darmstadt
Cabinet Magazine Article on Atlantropa

Unbuilt buildings and structures
Macro-engineering
Megastructures
Strait of Gibraltar
Geopolitics
1920s in science
Proposed power stations